Martin Feldman (September 12, 1922 – December 5, 2015) was the second head coach of the American Football League's Oakland Raiders. He became head coach on September 18, 1961, following the dismissal of Eddie Erdelatz. His overall record as head coach was 2-15. He was succeeded by Red Conkright on October 16, 1962.

Born in Los Angeles, California, Feldman played college football at Stanford University, where he played guard. He also played on the school's rugby team, and was named to the Stanford Athletic Hall of Fame for that sport. Feldman served in the United States Marines during World War II and earned three Purple Hearts. He died in Los Gatos, California on December 5, 2015 at the age of 93.

Coaching History
 Stanford University (1948-1954) Freshman
 University of New Mexico (1955) OL
 San Jose State University (1957-1959) OL
 Oakland Raiders (1960) OL
 Oakland Raiders (1961-1962)

References

External links
 ProFootballReference statistics for Marty Feldman

1922 births
2015 deaths
American football guards
Oakland Raiders coaches
San Jose State Spartans football coaches
Stanford Cardinal football coaches
Stanford Cardinal football players
Junior college football coaches in the United States
United States Marine Corps personnel of World War II
Players of American football from Los Angeles
Coaches of American football from California
American rugby union players
Sportspeople from Los Angeles
Sports coaches from Los Angeles
Oakland Raiders head coaches